Yuri de Oliveira (born 2 January 2001), simply known as Yuri, is a Brazilian professional footballer who plays as a midfielder for Flamengo.

Club career
Born in Vitória, Yuri began his career with Flamengo and made his professional debut on 27 September 2020 against Palmeiras. He came on as an 81st-minute substitute for João Lucas as Flamengo drew 1–1.

Career statistics

Club

Honours

Club
Flamengo
Campeonato Brasileiro Série A: 2020
Campeonato Carioca: 2021

References

External links

2001 births
Living people
People from Vitória, Espírito Santo
Brazilian footballers
Association football midfielders
CR Flamengo footballers
Campeonato Brasileiro Série A players
Sportspeople from Espírito Santo